Cooks Lake is a lake in St. Louis County, in the U.S. state of Minnesota located at an elevation of .

Cooks Lake bears the name of an early settler.

See also
List of lakes in Minnesota

References

Lakes of Minnesota
Lakes of St. Louis County, Minnesota